Siddhartha Chib is an econometrician and statistician, the Harry C. Hartkopf Professor of Econometrics and Statistics at Washington University in St. Louis. His work is primarily in Bayesian statistics, econometrics, and Markov chain Monte Carlo methods.

Key papers include Albert and Chib (1993) which introduced an approach for binary and categorical response models based on latent variables that simplifies the Bayesian analysis of categorical response models; Chib and Greenberg (1995) which provided a derivation of the Metropolis-Hastings algorithm from first principles, guidance on implementation and extensions to multiple-block versions; Chib (1995) where a new method for calculating the marginal likelihood from the Gibbs output is developed; Chib and Jeliazkov (2001) where the method of Chib (1995) is extended to output of Metropolis-Hastings chains; Basu and Chib (2003) for a method for finding marginal likelihoods in Dirichlet process mixture models; Carlin and Chib (1995) which developed a model-space jump method for Bayesian model choice via Markov chain Monte Carlo methods; Chib (1998) which introduced a multiple-change point model that is estimated by the methods of Albert and Chib (1993) and Chib (1996) for hidden Markov processes; Kim, Shephard and Chib (1998) which introduced an efficient inference approach for univariate and multivariate stochastic volatility models; and Chib and Greenberg (1998) which developed the Bayesian analysis of the multivariate probit model.

He has also developed original methods for Bayesian inference in Tobit censored responses, discretely observed diffusions, univariate and multivariate ARMA processes, multivariate count responses, causal inference, hierarchical models of longitudinal data, nonparametric regression, and unconditional and conditional moment models.

Biography
He received a bachelor's degree from St. Stephen’s College, Delhi, in 1979, an M.B.A. from the Indian Institute of Management, Ahmedabad, in 1982, and a Ph.D. in Economics from the University of California, Santa Barbara, in 1986. His advisors were Sreenivasa Rao Jammalamadaka and Thomas F. Cooley.

Honors and awards
He is a fellow of the American Statistical Association (2001), the International Society of Bayesian Analysis (2012), and the Journal of Econometrics (1996).

Selected publications
 Albert, Jim; Chib, Siddhartha. "Bayesian Analysis of Binary and Polychotomous Response Data". Journal of the American Statistical Association, 88(2), 669-679, 1993.
Chib, Siddhartha; Greenberg, Edward. "Understanding the Metropolis–Hastings Algorithm". American Statistician, 49(4), 327–335, 1995
Chib, Siddhartha. "Marginal Likelihood from the Gibbs Output". Journal of the American Statistical Association, 90(4), 1313–1321, 1995.
Carlin, Brad; Chib, Siddhartha. "Bayesian Model Choice via Markov Chain Monte Carlo Methods". Journal of the Royal Statistical Society, Series B, 57(3), 473–484, 1995.
Chib, Siddhartha. "Calculating Posterior Distributions and Modal Estimates in Markov Mixture Models". Journal of Econometrics, 75, 79-97, 1996.
 Kim, Sangjoon; Shephard, Neil; Chib, Siddhartha.  "Stochastic Volatility: Likelihood Inference and Comparison with ARCH Models, Review of Economic Studies, 65, 361–393, 1998.
Chib, Siddhartha. "Estimation and Comparison of Multiple Change Point Models". Journal of Econometrics, 86, 221-241, 1998.
Chib, Siddhartha; Jeliazkov, Ivan. "Marginal Likelihood from the Metropolis-Hastings Output". Journal of the American Statistical Association, 96(1), 270-281, 2001.
Chib, Siddhartha; Nardari, Federico; Shephard, Neil. "Markov Chain Monte Carlo Methods for Stochastic Volatility Models". Journal of Econometrics, 108, 281-316, 2002.
Chib, Siddhartha; Ramamurthy, Srikanth. "Tailored randomized block MCMC methods with application to DSGE models". Journal of Econometrics, 155, 19-38, 2010.
Chib, Siddhartha; Shin, Minchul; Simoni, Anna. "Bayesian Estimation and Comparison of Moment Condition Models". Journal of the American Statistical Association, 113(4), 1656-1668, 2018.
Chib, Siddhartha; Shin, Minchul; Simoni, Anna. "Bayesian Estimation and Comparison of Conditional Moment Models".  Journal of the Royal Statistical Society, Series B, 84 (3), 740-764, 2022.

References

External links
 Homepage
 

Living people
Bayesian statisticians
University of California, Santa Barbara alumni
Washington University in St. Louis faculty
Delhi University alumni
Econometricians
Fellows of the American Statistical Association
Year of birth missing (living people)